Mafa is a local government area of Borno State, Nigeria.

Mafa or MAFA may also refer to:

 MAFA (Mast cell function-associated antigen), a type II membranal glycoprotein
 MAFA (gene) (V-maf musculoaponeurotic fibrosarcoma oncogene homolog A (avian)), a human gene
 MafA, a type of MAF (gene), a human transcription factor
 Mafa (bug), a genus of lace bugs
 Mafa language, an Afro-Asiatic language spoken in northern Cameroon and eastern Nigeria
 Manchester Academy of Fine Arts in England
 Victorian Amateur Football Association, previously the Metropolitan Amateur Football Association, an Australian rules football competition